John Michael Schick (January 6, 1916 – January 8, 1990) was an American professional basketball player. He played for the Toledo Jeeps in the National Basketball League between 1946 and 1948, averaging 3.7 points per game. He also played for a number of Amateur Athletic Union and independent league teams.

Schick appeared in the first-ever NCAA tournament championship game in 1939, scoring one field goal in a losing effort against Oregon.

Schick was married to Virginia Willman of Coldwater Ohio.  They had three children: John Michael Schick III, Thomas Allen Schick, and Daniel Lee Schick

References

1916 births
1990 deaths
Amateur Athletic Union men's basketball players
American men's basketball players
Basketball players from Connecticut
Centers (basketball)
Forwards (basketball)
Ohio State Buckeyes men's basketball players
Oshkosh All-Stars players
Sportspeople from Bridgeport, Connecticut
Toledo Jeeps players
Central High School (Connecticut) alumni